Cuti bersama (or the “joint holiday”, literally collective leave) is a collective leave day in Indonesia. Cuti bersama was introduced by the Indonesian government as a means of stimulating tourism within the country and increasing the efficiency of public servants. The holiday is counted in public servants' overall leave. Most private companies and businesses follow suit by adjusting employees' annual leave in line with government policy. During major religious holidays such as before and after the Eid al Fitr day in three days, and also one day before the Christmas day joint-holiday can span an entire working week.

References 

 Indonesian Holidays
 Bali News: Indonesian Public Holidays for 2006

See also 
 Public holidays in Indonesia

Public holidays in Indonesia